The Sierra de la Cabrera is a mountain range in northern Spain.  The landscape shows evidence of past glaciation.

Ecological importance
The Sierra de la Cabrera gives its name to a Site of Community Importance (ES4190110), where species of interest include the Kerry slug.
The SCI partially overlaps with a Special Protection Area (ES4130024) designated under the Birds Directive.

References

Cabrera
Special Protection Areas of Spain